is a waterfall in the city of Towada, Aomori Prefecture, Japan, on a tributary of the Oirase River, which flows down from Lake Towada. It is one of "Japan’s Top 100 Waterfalls", in a listing published by the Japanese Ministry of the Environment in 1990.

External links
  Ministry of Environment

Waterfalls of Japan
Landforms of Aomori Prefecture
Tourist attractions in Aomori Prefecture
Towada, Aomori